John Butts may refer to:
John Butts (painter), Irish landscape painter
John E. Butts (1922–1944), Medal of Honor recipient
John L. Butts Jr. (1920–1992), U.S. Navy rear admiral and Navy Cross recipient
John L. Butts (1929–2011), U.S. Navy rear admiral and former director of the Office of Naval Intelligence

See also
John Butt (disambiguation)